Oklahoma Contemporary is a Contemporary Art Museum in downtown Oklahoma City, Oklahoma. It is a non-profit museum which was founded in 1989.

History
Construction on the new building began in 2018. The museum was started in 1989. Rand Elliott Architects designed the new building and it was completed in January 2020. The building has 53,916 square feet of space on four separate floors.

The building has an aluminum facade. The museum has space for education, performances and dance. There is also an outdoor space to display sculptures.

Exhibits
 Abstract Remix
 Video Games & Contemporary Art
 Chakaia Booker: Shaved Portions
 Maren Hassinger: Nature, Sweet Nature

See also
 List of museums in Oklahoma

References 

Art museums and galleries in Oklahoma
Museums in Oklahoma City
Museums established in 1989
Contemporary art galleries in the United States
1989 establishments in Oklahoma